Charlie Howell (13 September 1874 – 7 November 1934) was an Australian rules footballer who played with St Kilda in the Victorian Football League (VFL).

References

External links 

1874 births
1934 deaths
Australian rules footballers from Melbourne
St Kilda Football Club players
People from St Kilda, Victoria